Khamis Al-Marri (born 6 July 1984) is a Qatari football referee who is a listed international referee for FIFA and AFC since 2010.

He is also officiates in the Qatar Stars League.

Career
Al-Marri was summoned for the 2018 FIFA World Cup qualification in Russia based in AFC for 12 matches starting with a match between Nepal and India.

He was also summoned at the 2019 AFC Asian Cup in the United Arab Emirates.

References

1984 births
Living people
Qatari football referees
AFC Asian Cup referees